Syngrapha devergens is a moth of the family Noctuidae. It is found in the  Alps, the Tian Shan Mountains and the Altai Mountains

The wingspan is 29–31 mm. Adults are on wing from July to August in one generation per year. Adults have been recorded feeding on the flowers of Silene species.

The larvae feed on the leaves of Silene, Plantago, Viola  and Geum species. They are red-brown with yellow stripes. The larvae overwinter twice.

References

Literature
 Walter Forster, Theodor A. Wohlfahrt: Die Schmetterlinge Mitteleuropas, Band IV, Eulen. Franckh'sche Verlagshandlung, Stuttgart 1971 
 Barry Goater, Lázló Ronkay und Michael Fibiger: Catocalinae & Plusiinae Noctuidae Europaeae, Volume 10., Sorø 2003

External links

 www.nic.funet.fi
Lepiforum.de
Euroleps.ch

Moths described in 1871
Plusiinae
Moths of Europe
Moths of Asia